HMS Nemesis was a 46-gun  fifth-rate frigate built for the Royal Navy during the 1820s, one of four ships of the Druid sub-class.

Description
The Druid sub-class was an enlarged and improved version of the Serinapatam design, modified with a circular stern. The ship's tonnage was 1167  tons burthen. The Druid sub-class was armed with twenty-eight 18-pounder cannon on her gundeck, fourteen 32-pounder carronades on her quarterdeck and a pair of 9-pounder cannon and two more 32-pounder carronades in the forecastle. The ships had a crew of 315 officers and ratings.

Construction and career
Nemesis, the second ship of her name to serve in the Royal Navy, was ordered on 23 July 1817, laid down in August 1823 at Pembroke Dockyard, Wales, and launched on 19 August 1826. She was completed for ordinary at Plymouth Dockyard in September 1826 and the ship was roofed over from the mainmast forward. The ship was never commissioned and was broken up by 4 July 1866.

Notes

References

External links

Seringapatam-class frigate
1826 ships
Ships built in Pembroke Dock